Blackfoot Glacier is the second largest of the remaining 25 glaciers in Glacier National Park, Montana. Blackfoot Glacier is just to the north of Blackfoot Mountain and near Jackson Glacier. In 1850, there were an estimated 150 glaciers in the park. Glaciologists have stated that by the year 2030, all the glaciers in the park may disappear. However, under a modest increase in overall carbon dioxide levels, some glaciers will remain until the late 23rd century.
 
Jackson and Blackfoot glaciers have been selected for monitoring by the U.S. Geological Survey's Glacier Monitoring Research program, which is researching changes to the mass balance of glaciers in and surrounding Glacier National Park. The glacier is being monitored using remote sensing equipment and repeat photography, where images of the glacier are taken from identical locations periodically. Between 1966 and 2005, Blackfoot Glacier lost over 23 percent of its surface area.  In the summer of 2007, a portion of Blackfoot Glacier broke off and formed an ice avalanche.

See also
 List of glaciers in the United States
 Glaciers in Glacier National Park (U.S.)

References

Glaciers of Glacier County, Montana
Glaciers of Glacier National Park (U.S.)
Glaciers of Montana